Yarmouth was a British merchantman operating on the coast of India in 1782. The French frigate Fine captured her in June 1782. She went on the serve as a storeship in the squadron under Suffren.

Career 
The  captured Yarmouth in June 1782. She was carrying rice, field artillery, and nine officers for the British Army of Thanjavur garrisoned at Tiruchirappalli. Lloyd's List simply reported that the French fleet had captured "the Yarmouth Storeship, from Bengal, laden with Stores".

In early July 1782, during the run-up to the Battle of Negapatam, Suffren sent  and Yarmouth to Île de France (Mauritius). The hull of Yarmouth was sold at Cuddalore. No information regarding the vessel or her service reached French naval records; she does not appear in Roche.

Notes

Citations

References
 
 
 

Captured ships
Age of Sail merchant ships
Merchant ships of the United Kingdom